The Ambassador of Malaysia to the Republic of the Union of Myanmar is the head of Malaysia's diplomatic mission to Myanmar. The position has the rank and status of an Ambassador Extraordinary and Plenipotentiary and is based in the Embassy of Malaysia, Yangon.

History 
In March 1958 the governments in Yangon and Kuala Lumpur established diplomatic relations.
The first diplomatic Mission of the Government of Malaysia was opened at the Strand Hotel, Yangon.

List of heads of mission

Ambassadors to Myanmar

See also
Malaysia–Myanmar relations

References

 
Myanmar
Malaysia